The Vengeur was a 64-gun ship of the line of the French Navy designed by Antoine Groignard. She saw action with Bailli de Suffren during the American War of Independence.

Career 
Vengeur was originally built as an East Indiaman for the French East India Company, by Antoine Groignard. Her plans, however, followed military specification, as she was supposed to be able to integrate a naval squadron if necessary. She cruised as a merchantman from 1757 to 1765, when she was sold to the Navy. After a refit in Brest, she was brought into service under Captain Christy de La Pallière.

In October 1778, along with the frigate Belle Poule, she captured the privateer St Peters.

She took part in the Battle of Rhode Island on 29 August 1778, the Battle of Grenada on 6 July 1779, and the Siege of Savannah in September and October 1779, under Captain Croiset de Retz. She then took part in the Battle of Martinique on 18 December 1779 under Fournoue, when she, along with Annibal and Réfléchi, saved a convoy from the British off Fort Royal, and in the Battle of Martinique on 17 April 1780. 

Incorporated into Suffren's squadron, she was present at the Battle of Porto Praya under Comte de Forbin, although she did not take part in the action. She was similarly present at the Battle of Negapatam, there as well failed to take part in the action.  In July 1782, in the wake of the Battle of Negapatam, Suffren appointed Cuverville to Vengeur in replacement of Forbin (Lieutenant Périer de Salvert replaced Cuverville on his old ship, Flamand).

At the  Battle of Trincomalee, between 25 August and 3 September 1782, Vengeur caught fire, causing alarm to the ships around her. She left the French line of battle, which contributed to desorganising it. She took part in the Battle of Cuddalore on 20 June 1783 under Captain de Cuverville.

Fate 
Vengeur was sold to commerce in April 1784, and wrecked off La Réunion in March 1785.

Sources and references 
 Notes

References

 Bibliography
 
 
 
 
 

External links
 HMXMS Vengeur, 64, 3decks.pbworks.com

Ships of the line of the French Navy